Brittle Bone Rapper is a 24-minute documentary film about Sparsh Shah, a young rapper from New Jersey who has Osteogenesis Imperfecta, also known as  Brittle Bone Disorder. Unusually the film was commissioned by an independent producer as opposed to a broadcaster, media corporation or brand. It is the first original documentary commission from London and Los Angeles-based Little Dot Studios.

It shows how Sparsh Shah was inspired by Eminem to take up rap and how he had early success in social media with a cover version of an Eminem song. The action revolves around a life-saving operation 14 year old Sparsh has to have in the run-up to performing and being honored at the Champions of Hope awards ceremony in Los Angeles in 2017.

The film was produced by Doc Hearts for Little Dot Studios in 2018. It was directed by Andy Mundy-Castle and commissioned by Adam Gee for Real Stories channel.

Sparsh's family are of Indian descent from Gujarat and his rapping style incorporates aspects of Indian classical music.

References

External links

 Brittle Bone Rapper full documentary on Real Stories channel
 Sparsh performing Eminem's Not Afraid
 Sparsh's TED talk

2018 films
2018 short documentary films
British short documentary films
2010s English-language films
2010s British films